Wely is a hamlet in the Dutch province of Gelderland. It is a part of the municipality of Neder-Betuwe, and lies about 8 km south of Wageningen.

It was first mentioned in the late 11th century as "apud VUelie". The etymology is unknown. The postal authorities have placed it under Dodewaard.

References

Populated places in Gelderland
Neder-Betuwe